Alleghany is a small census-designated place in Sierra County, California, United States in the Sierra Nevada. It is situated in the Gold Country and continues to be a significant locale for gold mining. The Sixteen To One Mine has been in operation since the days of the California Gold Rush. The town is home to a post office, a bar (Casey's Place), and a mining museum. The population was 58 at the 2010 census.

The community was named in 1859 for the Alleghany Tunnel mine that fueled the growth of the town when it struck gold four years earlier. The mine itself was named for the Allegheny River.

Geography
According to the United States Census Bureau, the CDP covers an area of 0.3 square miles (0.9 km2), all of it land.

Demographics

The 2010 United States Census reported that Alleghany had a population of 58. The racial makeup of Alleghany was 58 (100.0%) White. Hispanic or Latino of any race were 1 persons (1.7%).

The Census reported that 58 people (100% of the population) lived in households, 0 (0%) lived in non-institutionalized group quarters, and 0 (0%) were institutionalized.

There were 27 households, out of which 5 (18.5%) had children under the age of 18 living in them, 12 (44.4%) were opposite-sex married couples living together, 3 (11.1%) had a female householder with no husband present, 2 (7.4%) had a male householder with no wife present. There were 5 (18.5%) unmarried opposite-sex partnerships, and 0 (0%) same-sex married couples or partnerships. 5 households (18.5%) were made up of individuals, and 1 (3.7%) had someone living alone who was 65 years of age or older. The average household size was 2.15. There were 17 families (63.0% of all households); the average family size was 2.35.

The population was spread out, with 8 people (13.8%) under the age of 18, 2 people (3.4%) aged 18 to 24, 5 people (8.6%) aged 25 to 44, 36 people (62.1%) aged 45 to 64, and 7 people (12.1%) who were 65 years of age or older. The median age was 53.0 years. For every 100 females, there were 123.1 males. For every 100 females age 18 and over, there were 117.4 males.

The homeowner vacancy rate was 5.9%; the rental vacancy rate was 0%. 37 people (63.8% of the population) lived in owner-occupied housing units and 21 people (36.2%) lived in rental housing units.

Politics

References

Further reading
 History of Sierra County, by James J. Sinnott, vol.3: Alleghany and Forest City: Treasure Towns, published by California Traveler, Volcano, California, 1975.
 Lode Deposits of the Alleghany District, California by Henry G. Ferguson, United States Geological Survey Bulletin #580, 1914.
  Gold Quartz Veins of the Alleghany District, California,  by HG Ferguson and RW Gannett,  US Geological Survey Professional Paper #172, 1932.

External links
 Original Sixteen to One Mine website
 Underground Gold Miners of California Museum
 Pliocene Ridge Community Services District

Census-designated places in Sierra County, California
Populated places in the Sierra Nevada (United States)